Jürgen Wittmann (born 14 August 1966 in Neustadt an der Donau) is a German former footballer who became a coach. He worked for many years as a goalkeeping coach with TSV 1860 Munich. He played five seasons in the Bundesliga for Fortuna Düsseldorf and SpVgg Unterhaching.

References

German footballers
German football managers
1. FC Nürnberg players
Fortuna Düsseldorf players
FC Ingolstadt 04 players
SpVgg Unterhaching players
TSV 1860 Munich II players
Bundesliga players
1966 births
Living people
Association football goalkeepers